Tanda is a village in the Mansehra District of the Khyber Pakhtunkhwa province of Pakistan. It is also the administrative centre of Tanda Union Council, a subdivision of Mansehra Tehsil. Most of the inhabitants are of the Swati tribe, subsection Gabri styled as 'Mirs' and known as Panjghols.

References

Union councils of Mansehra District